Mansur Mukhtar (born 21 September 1959) is a Nigerian economist who was appointed Minister of Finance in the cabinet of President Umaru Yar'Adua on 17 December 2008.
He left office in March 2010 when acting president Goodluck Jonathan dissolved his cabinet.
Dambazawa Family

Background

Muhtar was born on 21 September 1959, in Kano. He attended King's College, Lagos, and then Ahmadu Bello University, Zaria where he obtained a B.Sc. Economics in 1980. 
He worked at the Central Bank of Nigeria as an Assistant Economist (1980–81), and as a graduate assistant/assistant lecturer, in 1981 and 1982 at Bayero University, Kano.
He earned a master's degree in economics and politics of development from the University of Cambridge, United Kingdom in 1983, and a PhD in economics from the University of Sussex, Brighton in February 1988. Mukhtar was head of the department of economics and a lecturer at Bayero University, Kano, from 1988 to 1990.

Muhtar was special adviser/assistant to the minister of Agriculture and Natural Resources (1990–1992). He worked at the World Bank (1992–2000) in various roles. He was a deputy general manager at the United Bank for Africa between July 2000 and March 2001, and later was executive director at African Development Bank in Tunis.

He was appointed minister of finance in the cabinet of President Umaru Yar'Adua on 17 December 2008.

Muhtar has been executive director of the World Bank from 2011 to 2014. His appointment to this full-time position in Washington is a result of the creation of an additional seat for Africa on the board of the World Bank Group. Africa now has three seats on the board since November 2010. Dr Mansur's duties on the board will include setting strategic directions and approving policies and programmes of the World Bank Group in the member states, approving internal policies including human resources and oversight of matters related to the functioning of the group's duties.

In 2014 he moved to Jeddah, Saudi Arabia, where he became vice president of country operations of the Islamic Development Bank.

References

Federal ministers of Nigeria
Living people
1959 births
Alumni of the University of Sussex
King's College, Lagos alumni
Ahmadu Bello University alumni
Academic staff of Bayero University Kano
Alumni of the University of Cambridge
Finance ministers of Nigeria